Cloete or San José de Cloete is a coal-mining town in the municipality of Sabinas, in the Mexican state of Coahuila.

It was founded in the late 19th century by William Broderick Cloete, a British mine-owner.

In the 2005 INEGI Census it reported a population of 3,977.

Data
 
Altitude: 360 m
Postal code: 26960
Area code: 861

Populated places in Coahuila
Coal mines in Mexico
Mining communities in Mexico
Populated places established in the 19th century